Bobsleigh at the 2018 Winter Olympics was held at the Alpensia Sliding Centre near Pyeongchang, South Korea. The events were scheduled to take place between 18 and 25 February 2018. A total of three bobsleigh events were held.

Qualification

A maximum of 170 quota spots were available to athletes to compete at the games (130 men and 40 women). The qualification was based on the world rankings of 18 January 2018.

Competition schedule
The following was the competition schedule for all events.

All times are (UTC+9).

Medal summary

Medal table

Events

Participating nations
A total of 164 athletes from 22 nations (including the IOC's designation of Olympic Athletes from Russia) were scheduled to participate (the numbers of athletes are shown in parentheses). This was the first time that Nigeria had qualified for the Winter Games in any sport. The two-woman bobsleigh team was thus Nigeria's first ever representation at the Winter Olympics.

References

External links
 Official Results Book – Bobsleigh

 
2018 Winter Olympics
2018 Winter Olympics events
2018 in bobsleigh
Bobsleigh in South Korea